Hayden Gregory Wesneski (born December 5, 1997) is an American professional baseball pitcher for the Chicago Cubs of Major League Baseball (MLB). He made his MLB debut in 2022.

Amateur career
Wesneski attended Cy-Fair High School in Cypress, Texas. He played for the school's baseball team, and had a 25–9 win–loss record and a 3.56 earned run average (ERA). He graduated in 2016. The Tampa Bay Rays selected Wesneski in the 33rd round of the 2016 MLB draft, but he instead enrolled at Sam Houston State University to play college baseball for the Sam Houston State Bearkats.

Professional career

New York Yankees
The Yankees selected Wesneski in the sixth round of the 2019 Major League Baseball draft. He received a $217,500 signing bonus and played for the Pulaski Yankees after he signed, going 1–1 with a 4.76 ERA over  innings. He began the 2021 season with the Hudson Valley Renegades and was promoted to the Somerset Patriots and the Scranton/Wilkes-Barre RailRiders during the season. Over 25 games (24 starts) between the three teams, he went 11–6 with a 3.25 ERA and 151 strikeouts over  innings. Wesnewski returned to Scranton/Wilkes-Barre in 2022.

Chicago Cubs
On August 1, 2022, the Yankees traded Wesneski to the Chicago Cubs for relief pitcher Scott Effross. The Cubs assigned him to the Iowa Cubs.

The Cubs promoted Wesneski to the major leagues on September 6, 2022. He debuted that day and pitched five scoreless innings with eight strikeouts. On September 22, Wesneski pitched an immaculate inning versus the Pittsburgh Pirates.

References

External links

Living people
1997 births
Baseball players from Houston
Major League Baseball pitchers
Chicago Cubs players
Sam Houston Bearkats baseball players
Pulaski Yankees players
Hudson Valley Renegades players
Somerset Patriots players
Scranton/Wilkes-Barre RailRiders players
Iowa Cubs players